The Gulf of Sidra Offensive was an offensive of the Second Libyan Civil War. It was launched by the Benghazi Defense Brigades on 11 June 2018, and was fought concurrently with the Battle of Derna. On the first day, The Benghazi Defense Brigades captured Ras Lanuf and Sidra, before the Libyan National Army started a counteroffensive on 17 June. On 21 June, The LNA captured Ras Lanuf and Al Sidra. Hours later, The Benghazi Defense Brigades claimed to capture these cities once again, but the LNA denied these claims, releasing pictures showing their soldiers within Sidra and Ras Lanuf.

References

Military operations of the Second Libyan Civil War
Second Libyan Civil War
Conflicts in 2018